Licheng County is a county in the southeast of Shanxi province, China, bordering Hebei province to the east. It is under the administration of Changzhi city.

Climate

References

www.xzqh.org 

County-level divisions of Shanxi
Changzhi